Regan Matthew King (born 2 October 1980) is a New Zealand rugby union player who plays as a centre. He currently plays for Mid Canterbury in the Heartland Championship and Neath RFC in the Welsh Premier Division. He holds a British passport thanks to his British-born father, Paul King.

Career
After finishing school at Cambridge High School, King played for local rugby club Hautapu and was selected to play for Waikato in 2001. After playing for Waikato and the Chiefs, he made his first and only Test appearance on 23 November 2002 against Wales at the Millennium Stadium in Cardiff. Following this, King suffered several injuries hindering the progress of his career in New Zealand and taking him out of the NPC and Super 12. After recovering, King was recruited by Stade Français in November 2004.

After an unsuccessful six months in France, he moved to Wales to play for the Llanelli Scarlets.

In 2006, he was voted the best outside centre in the world by readers of Planet-Rugby.com for their 2006 World XV. King was the only one of the players voted into the side that had not played any international rugby in the preceding 12 months.

In January 2011 King agreed to join Clermont Auvergne at the end of the season.

After three years in France, King rejoined the Scarlets signing a two-year deal ahead of the 2014/15 season.

On 30 October 2015, King played alongside his son Jacob Cowley for the Scarlets against the Newport Gwent Dragons, making them the first father and son pair to play together in the Pro 12.

On 6 May 2016, it was announced that King would be leaving the Scarlets and joining Jersey Reds for the 2016–17 season.

King returned to New Zealand in 2017 and joined the Mid Canterbury club side Southern, helping them to win the Watters Cup competition final on 23 July at Mayfield.

Personal life
King's sister, Joelle, is a professional squash player who won Commonwealth Games gold medals in the doubles competition in 2010 and the singles competition in 2018. She also competed at the 2014 Commonwealth Games, winning a bronze medal in the singles competition.

References

External links
 

1980 births
Living people
New Zealand rugby union players
Rugby union centres
Stade Français players
Scarlets players
New Zealand international rugby union players
Sportspeople from Cambridge, New Zealand
Waikato rugby union players
Chiefs (rugby union) players
New Zealand expatriate rugby union players
Expatriate rugby union players in Wales
Expatriate rugby union players in France
New Zealand expatriate sportspeople in Wales
New Zealand expatriate sportspeople in France
People educated at Cambridge High School, New Zealand
Rugby union players from Waikato